Cispia alba is a moth of the family Erebidae first described by Frederic Moore in 1879. It is found in Sri Lanka.

The caterpillar is known to feed on Dysoxylum species.

References

Lymantriini
Moths of Sri Lanka
Moths described in 1879